The Akbayan Citizens' Action Party, better known as Akbayan, is a democratic socialist and progressive political party in the Philippines. Akbayan is noted as a leading member of the progressive movement in the Philippines, having been formed in 1998 by a variety of progressive political organizations.

There are approximately 100 thousand members of Akbayan, with a pool of voter interest ranging anywhere between 150 thousand to 1 million people (at most 2.5% of Philippine active voters).

History 

Akbayan was formally founded in 1998 by different civil society organizations and various left-leaning organizations from the country's social democratic, democratic socialist, and Marxist traditions with the intent of capturing state power through parliamentary struggle.

Akbayan has been critical of abuses committed by some members of the Armed Forces of the Philippines (AFP) against fellow activists. It has also been critical of the Communist Party of the Philippines, particularly its actions in the countryside against peasant groups and communities and what these groups and communities see as the Maoist group's extortion activities. Due to its stance against right-wing extremism (from some elements of the AFP) and the Maoist far-left (CPP–NPA–NDF), Akbayan has been a target of both political groups.

During the administration of former President Gloria Macapagal-Arroyo, Akbayan was among the opposition groups repressed by the government. It was also during this time that Akbayan suffered its lowest number of votes, with just over 400,000 votes in 2007. In 2009, Akbayan supported the presidential candidacy of then Senator Benigno Simeon Aquino III. Fueled by the popular discontent with the outgoing administration of Macapagal-Arroyo, Aquino won the presidency by a large margin. This was also the first time that Akbayan was able to breach the 1 million vote mark, its best performance to that date. Despite the vote increase, however, it failed to secure three seats in the House of Representatives owing to a Supreme Court decision which ensured only the leading party list (Ako Bicol at that time) in the election would secure three seats.

Akbayan has been noted to oppose the increased incursions of the People's Republic of China (PRC) naval and coast guard vessels into Philippine territorial waters and within the country's 200-nautical mile Exclusive Economic Zone (EEZ). In 2016, the party allied itself with the Liberal Party and the Magdalo Group, supporting Mar Roxas and Leni Robredo's campaigns and criticizing other candidates. After the election, it joined the Magnificent 7, a group of Liberal Party and Magdalo members. The party publicly criticized several policies of the Duterte government, including Duterte's handling of the Philippine Drug War and the TRAIN Law.

Akbayan has affiliate groups that represent government employees, women workers, migrants, as well as members of the LGBT community. The party's official website states that Akbayan is an activist organisation "and proud of it", and that it "vehemently condemn(s) torture, assassination, and other violent acts that undermine human rights and freedoms regardless of whoever commits them".

Ideology 

The party includes both democratic socialists and social democrats as members. While Akbayan's political-economic platform rests on the democratic-socialist foundation which the ruling PDP–Laban ostensibly shares, the former differs greatly from the latter with regard to civil rights and law enforcement.

Legislative record 

 Republic Act 9189 – The Overseas Absentee Voting Act of 2003
 Republic Act 9481 – Right to Labor Self-Organization Law
 Republic Act 9502 – Cheaper and Quality Medicines Law
 Republic Act 9700 – Comprehensive Agrarian Reform Program Extension with Reforms (CARPER) Law
 Republic Act 10354 – Responsible Parenthood and Reproductive Health Law
 Republic Act 10351 – Restructuring the Excise Tax on Alcohol and Tobacco or The Sin Tax Law
 Republic Act 10368 – Human Rights Victims Reparation and Recognition Act of 2013
 Republic Act 10667 – Philippine Competition Act
 Republic Act 10028 – Expanded Breastfeeding Promotion Law
 Republic Act 10742 – Sangguniang Kabataan Reform Law
 Republic Act 10643 – Graphic Health Warning Law
 Republic Act 10932 – Anti-Hospital Deposit Act
 Republic Act 11036 – Mental Health Act
 Republic Act 11166 – HIV and AIDS Policy Act of 2018

Electoral performance

President 

Notes

Vice president

Senate elections

House of Representatives elections

Party-list elections
Akbayan is only one of two parties (the other is Butil) to win seats in all party-list elections in the Philippines until 2019. Furthermore, Akbayan is the only party to surpass the 2% election threshold in all elections until the 2016 election where they fell short by 0.12%.

Elections in congressional districts
In 2013, Kaka Bag-ao ran for the Dinagat Islands seat under the Akbayan label and won; she subsequently ran under the Liberal Party label in subsequent elections.

Representatives to Congress

Candidates for 2013 elections 
 Risa Hontiveros – Senator
 Arlene "Kaka" Bag-ao – District Representative, Dinagat Islands (under Liberal Party)
 Walden F. Bello – 1st nominee, party-list
 Ibarra M. Gutierrez III – 2nd nominee, party-list
 Angelina Ludovice Katoh – 3rd nominee, party-list
 Sylvia Estrada Claudio – 4th nominee, party-list
 Francis Q. Isaac – 5th nominee, party-list
 Edwin A. Bustillos – 6th nominee, party-list

Candidates for 2016 elections 
 Risa Hontiveros – Senator
 Tomasito Villarin – 1st nominee, party-list
 Barry Gutierrez III – 2nd nominee, party-list
 Angelina Katoh – 3rd nominee, party-list
 Rafaela Mae David – 4th nominee, party-list
 Doris Obena – 5th nominee, party-list
 Mylene Hega – 6th nominee, party-list
 Cenon Nolasco – 7th nominee, party-list
 Pat Ibay – Councilor (District 1, Pasay)
 Ileana Ibay – Councilor (District 2, Pasay)
 Alvin Dizon – Councilor (District 1, Cebu City)
 Sergio Bañes Jr. – Councilor (Estancia, Iloilo)
 Egar Chu – Councilor (Estancia, Iloilo)

Candidates for 2019 elections 
 Tomasito Villarin – 1st nominee, party-list
 Gio Tingson – 2nd nominee, party-list
 Doris Dinorog-Obena – 3rd nominee, party-list
 Angelina Katoh – 4th nominee, party-list
 Napoleon Merida – 5th nominee, party-list
 Cristina Oganiza – 6th nominee, party-list

Candidates for 2022 elections 
 Risa Hontiveros – Senator
 Percival Cendaña – 1st nominee, party-list
 Dr. Raymond John Naguit – 2nd nominee, party-list
 Cristina Oganiza – 3rd nominee, party-list
 Angelina Katoh – 4th nominee, party-list
 JC Tejano – 5th nominee, party-list
 Victoria de Jesus – 6th nominee, party-list
Local Candidates
 Lyn Dialde - Board Member, Dinagat Islands
 Fely Pedrablanca - Mayor, Tubajon, Dinagat Islands
 Rexon Arevalo - Vice Mayor, Nagcarlan, Laguna
 Ernesto Balida - Vice Mayor, Batad, Iloilo
 Petnel Sombrado - Vice Mayor, Dinagat, Dinagat Islands
 Zoltan Edera - Vice Mayor, Libjo, Dinagat Islands
 Liezl Aguirre - Councilor, San Jose del Monte, Bulacan
 Tobit Cruz - Councilor, Taytay, Rizal
 Erwin Dimaculangan - Councilor, Alitagtag, Batangas
 Elaine Teope - Councilor, Luisiana, Laguna
 Laurence Sombilla - Councilor, Nagcarlan, Laguna
 Richard Pavico - Councilor, San Pablo, Laguna
 Gilbert Arrabis Jr. - Councilor, Daanbantayan, Cebu
 Wilfredo Punay - Councilor, Tubajon, Dinagat Islands
 Samson Tidalgo - Councilor, Tubajon, Dinagat Islands

References

External links 

 
 
 

1998 establishments in the Philippines
Centre-left parties in Asia
Citizens' Action Parties
Feminist organizations in the Philippines
Feminist parties in Asia
Former member parties of the Socialist International
Party-lists represented in the House of Representatives of the Philippines
Political parties established in 1998
Progressive Alliance
Social democratic parties in Asia